Chad Mock (born March 23, 1984) is a professional football player who played for the BC Lions of the Canadian Football League in 2007. He is currently a member of their practice squad. Chad played the wide receiver position with the Lions, and wore jersey number #83.

Early life 
Born in Long Beach, California, Mock moved with his family to Hawaii where he attended Farrington High School in Oahu.  Mock graduated from Farrington in 2002 and was a three-sport letterman in football, basketball and track & field. He is the brother of activist and writer Janet Mock.

Career

College 
Mock played two years of college football with Avila University in Kansas City, Missouri, before transferring to the University of Hawaii in 2004.  After a redshirt season in 2004, Mock played in eight games for the Warriors, recorded 42 catches for 502 yards and one touchdown in 2005.  Mock caught a career-high 147 yards, including his first collegiate touchdown, against New Mexico State (and caught a career-high 11 passes (104 yards) at San Jose State. Mock finished his collegiate career with 68 catches for 880 yards in over 20 games for the Warriors.

Professional 
Mock began his professional football career with the CFL British Columbia Lions, signing as a free agent in May, 2007.  Originally signed to the developmental squad, Mock started three games as a wide receiver/slotback with the team.

Mock's uncle, Alvis Satele, was a defensive lineman for the Lions in 1987.

Mock was released by the Lions on May 13, 2008, prior to the start of the 2008 CFL season.

External links
BC Lions Official Website – Player Profile:  Chad Mock #83
University of Hawaii Player Biography – Chad Mock #88

1984 births
Living people
American players of Canadian football
BC Lions players
Canadian football slotbacks
Canadian football wide receivers
Hawaii Rainbow Warriors football players
Players of Canadian football from Long Beach, California
Sportspeople from Hawaii